Year 153 (CLIII) was a common year starting on Sunday (link will display the full calendar) of the Julian calendar. At the time, it was known as the Year of the Consulship of Rusticus and Rufinus (or, less frequently, year 906 Ab urbe condita). The denomination 153 for this year has been used since the early medieval period, when the Anno Domini calendar era became the prevalent method in Europe for naming years.

Events 
 By place 

 Roman Empire 
 Minor uprisings occur in Roman Egypt against Roman rule.

 Asia 
 Change of era name from Yuanjia (3rd year) to Yongxing of the Chinese Han  Dynasty.

Births 
 Didia Clara, daughter of Didius Julianus
 Kong Rong, Chinese official and warlord (d. 208)
 Zhang Hong, Chinese official and politician (d. 212)

Deaths 
Tiberius Julius Rhoemetalces, Roman client king

References